Break on through may refer to:
 "Break On Through (To the Other Side)", a song by The Doors, 1967
"Break On Through" (Grey's Anatomy), episode of TV series
Break On Through (album), by Jeanette, 2003

See also
Breakthrough (disambiguation)